Jorge Alonso (born 26 July 1958) is a Spanish water polo player. He competed in the men's tournament at the 1980 Summer Olympics.

References

1958 births
Living people
Spanish male water polo players
Olympic water polo players of Spain
Water polo players at the 1980 Summer Olympics
Water polo players from Barcelona